Arkansas Highway 20 (AR 20, Hwy. 20) is an east–west state highway in Phillips County, Arkansas. The route of  runs from Lambrook northeast to US 49 in Helena-West Helena. Segments of the route make up the western routing of the Great River Road.

Route description
AR 20 begins near Lambrook facing south at County Route 622 when the route turns due east. After the highway passes the Lambrook post office, the route serves as the southern terminus for Highway 318 and turns southeast toward Elaine. The city brings a junction with Highway 44, after which AR 20 becomes a minor state highway winding along the Mississippi River. The route passes through the unincorporated community of Modoc before forming its only spur route. This spur runs due south to the Mississippi River. The parent highway AR 20 continues as a two-lane rural route, meeting AR 44 in south Helena-West Helena before terminating at US 49.

Great River Road

The Great River Road runs on AR 20 from US 49 to AR 44 in the extreme southern part of Helena-West Helena. The scenic byway follows AR 44 south to Elaine, when the Great River Road joins with AR 20 westbound. The route remains scenic until the junction with AR 318 east of Lambrook.

History

Highway 20 was one of the original state highways, designated in 1926. The route began at Highway 3 in east Monroe County and ran east through Marvell and Barton on its way to Helena, when the route turned south. Highway 20 continued south along its current routing from Helena, then along its present spur route to terminate at the Mississippi River. Highway 3 was later replaced by US 79 in the area. In 1962, all of Highway 20 was transferred to Highway 6 and Highway 49. In 1963, Highway 20 was reestablished as a renumbering of Highway 49 from Helena to Lambrook, and Highway 49 Spur became Highway 20 Spur.
Arkansas Highway 49 was designated from Highway 20 to Highway 44 in Elaine. It extended to Lambrook in 1952. In September 1962, it extended to Helena, replacing half of Highway 20. The section of Highway 20 from Highway 49's former end at Highway 20 became a spur of Highway 49. In 1963, US 49 extended into Arkansas, and Highway 49 was renumbered Highway 20.

Major intersections

Spur route

Arkansas Highway 20 Spur is a spur route in east Phillips County. It is a former alignment of AR 20 that leads to a levee on the Mississippi River.

Major intersections

See also

 List of state highways in Arkansas

References

External links

020
Transportation in Phillips County, Arkansas
020